The 2018 Chinese Taipei Open (officially known as the Yonex Chinese Taipei Open 2018 for sponsorship reasons) was a badminton tournament that took place at the Taipei Arena in Taipei, Taiwan, from 2 to 7 October 2018 and had a total prize of $500,000.

Tournament 
The 2018 Chinese Taipei Open was the nineteenth tournament of the 2018 BWF World Tour and also part of the Chinese Taipei Open championships, which had been held annually since 1980. This tournament was organized by the Chinese Taipei Badminton Association and sanctioned by the BWF.

Venue 
This international tournament was held at the Taipei Arena in Taipei, Taiwan.

Point distribution 
Below is the point distribution table for each phase of the tournament based on the BWF points system for the BWF World Tour Super 300 event.

Prize money 
The total prize money for this tournament was US$500,000. Distribution of prize money was in accordance with BWF regulations.

Men's singles

Seeds

 Chou Tien-chen (semi-finals)
 Wang Tzu-wei (first round)
 Liew Daren (first round)
 Hsu Jen-hao (first round)
 Jan Ø. Jørgensen (semi-finals)
 Ihsan Maulana Mustofa (first round)
 Lucas Corvée (first round)
 Chong Wei Feng (quarter-finals)

Finals

Top half

Section 1

Section 2

Bottom half

Section 3

Section 4

Women's singles

Seeds

 Tai Tzu-ying (champion)
 Michelle Li (first round)
 Line Kjærsfeldt (final)
 Pai Yu-po (quarter-finals)
 Yip Pui Yin (semi-finals)
 Lee Chia-hsin (second round)
 Soniia Cheah Su Ya (semi-finals)
 Fitriani (quarter-finals)

Finals

Top half

Section 1

Section 2

Bottom half

Section 3

Section 4

Men's doubles

Seeds

 Chen Hung-ling / Wang Chi-lin (champions)
 Lee Jhe-huei / Lee Yang (quarter-finals)
 Liao Min-chun / Su Ching-heng (final)
 Ong Yew Sin / Teo Ee Yi (second round)
 Bodin Isara / Maneepong Jongjit (semi-finals)
 Aaron Chia / Soh Wooi Yik (quarter-finals)
 Lu Ching-yao / Yang Po-han (semi-finals)
 Mohamad Arif Abdul Latif / Nur Mohd Azriyn Ayub (second round)

Finals

Top half

Section 1

Section 2

Bottom half

Section 3

Section 4

Women's doubles

Seeds

 Ayako Sakuramoto / Yukiko Takahata (semi-finals)
 Naoko Fukuman / Kurumi Yonao (semi-finals)
 Hsu Ya-ching / Wu Ti-jung (first round)
 Nami Matsuyama / Chiharu Shida (champions)
 Lim Chiew Sien / Tan Sueh Jeou (first round)
 Ng Tsz Yau / Yuen Sin Ying (quarter-finals)
 Chen Hsiao-huan / Hu Ling-fang (first round)
 Agatha Imanuela / Siti Fadia Silva Ramadhanti (quarter-finals)

Finals

Top half

Section 1

Section 2

Bottom half

Section 3

Section 4

Mixed doubles

Seeds

 Wang Chi-lin / Lee Chia-hsin (quarter-finals)
 Lee Yang / Hsu Ya-ching (second round)
 Chen Tang Jie / Peck Yen Wei (semi-finals)
 Chang Tak Ching / Ng Wing Yung (first round)
 Tontowi Ahmad / Winny Oktavina Kandow (withdrew)
 Rinov Rivaldy / Pitha Haningtyas Mentari (quarter-finals)
 Kohei Gondo / Ayane Kurihara (quarter-finals)
 Alfian Eko Prasetya / Marsheilla Gischa Islami (champions)

Finals

Top half

Section 1

Section 2

Bottom half

Section 3

Section 4

References

External links 
 Tournament Link

Chinese Taipei Open
Chinese Taipei Open (badminton)
Chinese Taipei Open (badminton)
Chinese Taipei Open (badminton)